Ferdinand Kobell (7 June 1740, Mannheim – 1 February 1799, Munich) was a German painter and copper engraver.

Biography
His family was originally from Hesse. His grandfather, Johann Heinrich Kobell, was a prosperous grocer who came to Mannheim from Frankfurt-am-Main in 1720. His parents were Balthasar Kobell (d.1762), an entrepreneur and Court Councilor, and Maria Franziska née Mezinger (1718-1762).

He initially studied law in Heidelberg, becoming a secretary to the court in 1760, but he soon turned his attention to painting. In 1764, he started work as a theatrical painter and married Maria Anna Lederer (1744-1820), daughter of one of the Court Councilors. They had seven children, including Wilhelm von Kobell, who became a landscape, animal and battle painter.

In 1766, he was appointed court painter. To complete his training, he took an eighteen-month study trip to Paris, where he made contact with the expatriate German engraver, Johann Georg Wille.

In 1794, when his court patron, Elector Charles Theodore decided to move from Mannheim to Munich, he followed him there.

He specialized in landscapes, inspired by the style of Nicolaes Pieterszoon Berchem. His oil paintings are in a number of German galleries (Karlsruhe, Darmstadt, Stuttgart, and Augsburg), but his work as an engraver is considered more important. His etchings (about 300) were published by Frauenholz, in Munich (1809), as Œuvres complètes de Ferdinand Kobell. More were published by Kugler (Stuttgart, 1842).

Gallery

References

Further reading
 
 Joseph August Beringer: Ferdinand Kobell: eine Studie über sein Leben und Schaffen. Hahn, Mannheim 1909.
 Margret Biedermann: Ferdinand Kobell: 1740–1799; das malerische und zeichnerische Werk. Galerie Margret Biedermann, München 1973.

External links

 
 

1740 births
1799 deaths
18th-century German painters
18th-century German male artists
German male painters
German engravers
Heidelberg University alumni